The Azerbaijan Rugby Federation is the governing body for Rugby union in Azerbaijan. It oversees the various national teams as well as development.

External links
 Azerbaijan Rugby Federation

See also
Rugby union in Azerbaijan
Azerbaijan national rugby union team

 
Rugby union governing bodies in Europe
Rugby